HMS Bravo was a 16-gun  of the Royal Navy, launched in 1794. The two-vessel class was intended to operate in shallow waters. Bravo spent her brief, uneventful service life as the flagship for Commodore Philippe d'Auvergne's flotilla at Jersey. After the Peace of Amiens Bravo was paid off in March 1802; she was sold in 1803.

Service
Sir John Henslow designed the class on the model of flat-bottomed Thames barges. Commander John Dawson commissioned Bravo in June 1794. Commodore d'Auvergne recommissioned her in July for the Jersey-based Channel Islands flotilla, of which he was the commander. In November the Admiralty re-rated Bravo as a sixth rate to give d'Auvergne a salary more commensurate with his rank and role.

Bravo did earn some prize money. She was at Plymouth on 20 January 1795 and so shared in the proceeds of the detention of the Dutch naval vessels, East Indiamen, and other merchant vessels that were in port on the outbreak of war between Britain and the Netherlands.

Fate
Bravo was sold in Jersey in 1803.

Citations

References
 

Floating batteries of the Royal Navy
1794 ships
Ships built in Woolwich